The 2019 ACC Emerging Teams Asia Cup was the fourth edition of the ACC Emerging Teams Asia Cup held in Bangladesh between 14 and 23 November 2019. Eight teams participated in the tournament, including five under-23 age level teams of Test nations and the top three teams from the 2018 Asia Cup Qualifier. The tournament was organized by the Asian Cricket Council (ACC). Nepal replaced the United Arab Emirates, after they pulled out due to an unknown reason. Nepal qualified on virtue of being fourth in the Asia Cup qualifier.

Pakistan won the tournament, beating Bangladesh by 77 runs in the final.

Teams
The teams were placed in the following groups:

Squads 

Prior to the start of the tournament,  India's Kamlesh Nagarkoti and Arshdeep Singh were ruled out of the tournament and were replaced by Aditya Thakare and Shivam Mavi respectively.

Group stage

Group A 

 Advanced to knockout stage.

Group B

 Advanced to knockout stage.

Knockout stage

Semi finals

Final

References

External links
 Series home at ESPNcricinfo

International cricket competitions in 2019
Asian Cricket Council competitions